The United States is scheduled to compete at the 2023 Pan American Games in Santiago, Chile from October 20 to November 5, 2023. This was the United States's 19th appearance at the Pan American Games, having competed at every Games since the inaugural edition in 1951.

Competitors
The following is the list of number of competitors (per gender) participating at the games per sport/discipline.

Archery

The United States qualified one archer after winning the respective event at the 2021 Junior Pan American Games. The United States also qualified 10 archers during the 2022 Pan American Archery Championship.

Men

Women

Mixed

Artistic swimming

The United States automatically qualified a full team of nine artistic swimmers.

Basketball

5x5
The United States qualified a men's team (of 12 athletes) by finishing third in the 2022 FIBA Americup.

Men's tournament

Summary

3x3

Men's tournament

The United States qualified a men's team (of 4 athletes) by winning the 2022 FIBA 3x3 AmeriCup.

Summary

Women's tournament

The United States qualified a women's team (of 4 athletes) by finishing third in the 2022 FIBA 3x3 AmeriCup.

Summary

Basque pelota 

The United States qualified a team of 2 athletes (two men) through the 2022 Basque Pelota World Championship in Biarritz, France.

Bowling

The United States qualified two men and two women through the 2022 PABCON Champion of Champions held in Rio de Janeiro, Brazil.

Boxing

Men

Women

Canoeing

Sprint
The United States qualified a total of 16 sprint athletes (eight men and eight women).

Men

Women

Cycling

BMX
The United States qualified four cyclists (two men and two women) in BMX race through the UCI World Rankings.

Racing

Diving

The United States has qualified 10 divers (4 male and 6 female) through the 2022 FINA World Aquatics Championships and a further male diver through the 2021 Junior Pan American Games.

Men

Women

Fencing

The United States qualified a full team of 18 fencers (nine men and nine women), after all six teams finished at least in the top seven at the 2022 Pan American Fencing Championships in Ascuncion, Paraguay.

Men

Women

Field hockey

Men's tournament

The United States qualified a men's team (of 16 athletes) by finishing fourth at the 2022 Pan American Cup.

Summary

Women's tournament

The United States qualified a women's team (of 16 athletes) by finishing fourth at the 2022 Pan American Cup.

Summary

Football

Men's tournament

The United States qualified a men's team of 18 athletes by winning the 2022 CONCACAF U-20 Championship.

Summary

Women's tournament

The United States qualified a women's team of 18 athletes by winning the 2022 CONCACAF W Championship.

Summary

Judo

The United States has qualified two judokas (one man and one woman) after winning the categories at the 2021 Junior Pan American Games.

Men

Women

Mixed

Karate

The United States qualified a team of 4 karatekas (three men and one woman) after winning each category during the 2021 Junior Pan American Games.

Kumite

Modern pentathlon

The United States qualified five modern pentathletes (two men and three women).

Roller sports

Figure
The United States qualified a team of two athletes in figure skating (one man and one woman).

Rugby sevens

Men's tournament

The United States men's team is automatically qualified to the Pan American Games.

Summary

Women's tournament

The United States women's team is automatically qualified to the Pan American Games.

Summary

Sailing

The United States has qualified 11 boats for a total of 17 sailors.

Men

Women

Mixed

Shooting

The United States qualified a total of 24 shooters after the 2022 Americas Shooting Championships. The United States also qualified three shooters by winning the events in the 2021 Junior Pan American Games.

Men

Women

Mixed

Softball

The United States qualified a women's team (of 18 athletes) by winning the 2021 Junior Pan American Games.

Summary

Squash

Surfing

The United States qualified four surfers (two men and two women).

Artistic

Race

Table tennis

The United States qualified a full team of six athletes (three men and three women) through the 2022 ITTF Pan American Championships.
 
Men

Women

Mixed

Taekwondo

The United States has qualified three athletes at Kyorugi events, by virtue of their titles in the 2021 Junior Pan American Games.

Kyorugi

Volleyball

Indoor

Women's tournament

The United States qualified a women's team (of 12 athletes) by finishing third at the 2022 Women's Pan-American Volleyball Cup.

Summary

Water polo

Men's tournament

The United States automatically qualified a men's team (of 11 athletes).

Summary

Women's tournament

The United States automatically qualified a women's team (of 11 athletes).

Summary

Water skiing

The United States qualified two wakeboarders (one of each gender) during the 2022 Pan American Championship.

The United States also qualified four water skiers during the 2022 Pan American Water skiing Championship.

Men

Women

Wakeboard

Weightlifting

Wrestling

The United States qualified ten wrestlers (Men's Freestyle: 57 kg and 97 kg), (Greco-Roman: 60 kg, 77 kg and 97 kg), (Women's Freestyle: 50 kg, 53 kg, 57 kg, 62 kg and 76 kg) through the 2022 Pan American Wrestling Championships held in Acapulco, Mexico. The United States also qualified four wrestlers (Men's Freestyle: 65 kg, 74 kg, 86 kg and 125 kg) by winning the 2021 Junior Pan American Games.

Men

Women

See also
United States at the 2023 Parapan American Games
United States at the 2024 Summer Olympics

References

Nations at the 2023 Pan American Games
2023
2023 in American sports